Herbie Mann Plays The Roar of the Greasepaint – The Smell of the Crowd is an album by American jazz flautist Herbie Mann featuring tunes from the Broadway musical by Leslie Bricusse and Anthony Newley, The Roar of the Greasepaint – The Smell of the Crowd, recorded for the Atlantic label and released in 1965.

Reception

AllMusic awarded the album 3 stars calling it "One of Mann's less significant projects of the '60s".

Track listing
All compositions by Leslie Bricusse and Anthony Newley
 "The Joker" - 2:39
 "Feeling Good" - 3:30
 "Where Would You Be Without Me?" - 2:26
 "It Isn't Enough" - 2:26
 "Look at That Face" - 2:25
 "This Dream" - 2:01
 "Who Can I Turn To (When Nobody Needs Me)" - 2:17
 "The Beautiful Land" - 2:12
 "My First Love Song" - 4:18
 "Sweet Beginning" - 2:00
 "A Wonderful Day Like Today" - 2:30
Recorded in New York City on March 3 (tracks 1, 2, 5 & 7), March 4 (tracks 3, 6, 8 & 10) and March 5 (tracks 4, 9 & 11), 1965

Personnel 
Herbie Mann - flute
John Hitchcock, Mark Weinstein - trombone
Dave Pike - vibraphone
Chick Corea (tracks 1, 2, 5 & 7), Roger Kellaway (tracks 3, 4, 6 & 8-11) - piano
Gene Bertoncini (tracks 3, 4, 6 & 8-11), Mundell Lowe (tracks 1, 2, 5 & 7), Turk Van Lake (tracks 4, 9 & 11) - guitar
Earl May - bass
Bruno Carr - drums
Carlos "Patato" Valdes - congas
Unidentified string section arranged and conducted by Ray Ellis (tracks 1, 2, 5 & 7)

References 

1965 albums
Herbie Mann albums
Albums produced by Nesuhi Ertegun
Atlantic Records albums
Albums arranged by Ray Ellis